Abelian may refer to:

Mathematics

Group theory
 Abelian group, a group in which the binary operation is commutative
 Category of abelian groups (Ab), has abelian groups as objects and group homomorphisms as morphisms
 Metabelian group, a group where the commutator subgroup is abelian
 Abelianisation

Topology and number theory
 Abelian variety, a complex torus that can be embedded into projective space
 Abelian surface, a two-dimensional abelian variety
 Abelian function, a meromorphic function on an abelian variety
 Abelian integral, a function related to the indefinite integral of a differential of the first kind

Other mathematics
 Abelian category, in category theory, a preabelian category in which every monomorphism is a kernel and every epimorphism is a cokernel
 Abelian and Tauberian theorems, in real analysis, used in the summation of divergent series
 Abelian extension, in Galois theory, a field extension for which the associated Galois group is abelian
 Abelian von Neumann algebra, in functional analysis, a von Neumann algebra of operators on a Hilbert space in which all elements commute

Other uses
 Abelian, in physics, a gauge theory with a commutative symmetry group
 Hovhannes Abelian (1865–1936), Armenian actor

See also
 Pre-abelian category, an additive category that has all kernels and cokernels
 Niels Henrik Abel (1802–1829), Norwegian mathematician who gave his name to several different mathematical concepts
 Abelians, a 4th-century Christian sect
 Abel, a Biblical figure in the Book of Genesis